This is a list of recording artists who have reached number one on Billboard magazine's Mainstream Top 40 chart.

0-9
 2 Chainz (1)
 3 Doors Down (3)
 3OH!3 (1)
 5 Seconds of Summer (1)
 24kGoldn (1)
 50 Cent (1)

A
 Ace of Base (3)
 Bryan Adams (1)
 Adele (5)
 Aerosmith (1)
 Afrojack (1)
 Christina Aguilera (5)
 All-4-One (1)
 The All-American Rejects (1)
 A$AP Rocky (1)
 Avicii (1)
 Iggy Azalea (3)

B

C

D

E
 Eagle-Eye Cherry (1)
 Billie Eilish (2)
 Missy Elliott (1)
 Eminem (3)
 Evanescence (1)
 Eve (1)
 Everything but the Girl (1)

F
 Dionne Farris (1)
 Fergie (4)
 Fifth Harmony (1)
 Flo Rida (5)
 Jamie Foxx (1)
 Luis Fonsi (1)
 DJ Frank E (1)
 Nicki French (1)
 Fugees (1)
 Nelly Furtado (2)

G

H
 Halsey (4)
 Hanson (1)
 Jack Harlow (1)
 Calvin Harris (1)
 The Heights (1)
 Don Henley (1)
 Keri Hilson (1)
 Hinder (1)
 Hoobastank (1)
 Niall Horan (1)
 Hootie & The Blowfish (1)
 Whitney Houston (1)

I
 Enrique Iglesias (1)
 Imagine Dragons (3)
 Natalie Imbruglia (1)
 Iyaz (1)

J
 Felix Jaehn (1)
 Ja Rule (2)
 Janet Jackson (2)
 Jawsh 685 (1)
 Jay-Z (2)
 Wyclef Jean (1)
 Jewel (2)
 JID (1)
 JoJo (1)
 Jonas Brothers (1)

K
 R. Kelly (1)
 Kesha (3)
 Alicia Keys (2)
 Khalid (3)
 The Kid Laroi (1)
 Kings of Leon (1)
 Wiz Khalifa (2)
 Lenny Kravitz (1)
 Kyla (1)

L

M

N
 'NSync (2)
 Nayer (1)
 Nelly (5)
 Ne-Yo (2)
 NF (1)
 Nickelback (2)
 Nico & Vinz (1)
 Nine Days (1)
 No Doubt (3)
 Normani (2)

O
 Colby O'Donis (1)
 OMC (1)
 OMI (1)
 OneRepublic (2)
 O-Town (1)
 Outkast (2)
 Rita Ora (1)

P
 Panic! at the Disco (1)
 Sean Paul (4)
 Liam Payne (1)
 Katy Perry (11)
 Kim Petras (1)
 Pink (9)
 Pitbull (2)
 Portugal. The Man (1)
 Mike Posner (1)
 Pussycat Dolls (2)
 Charlie Puth (2)

Q
Quavo (2)

R

S

T

U
 UB40 (1)
 Usher (2)

V

W
 The Weeknd (5)
 Kanye West (3)
 Pharrell Williams (2)
 Wizkid (1)

X
 Charli XCX (2)

Y

Daddy Yankee (1)
Young Thug (1)
Nicky Youre (1)

Z
 ZAYN (1)
 Zedd (2)

References

Mainstream Top 40